Daniel Bueno may refer to:

 Daniel Bueno (model) (born 1977), Brazilian model and television personality
 Daniel Bueno (footballer) (born 1983), Brazilian footballer